Bonnie Glick is an American diplomat and businesswoman who served as the Deputy Administrator of the United States Agency for International Development from 2019 to 2020. Nominated for the post by President Donald Trump in April 2018, she was confirmed by the United States Senate by unanimous consent in January 2019. On September 21, 2021, Glick was announced as the inaugural director of the Krach Institute for Tech Diplomacy at Purdue during the Concordia Summit on the margins of the UN General Assembly. She is a Life Member of the Council on Foreign Relations.

Early life and education 
Glick grew up in Chicago where she attended the Akiba Schechter Jewish Day School and Kenwood Academy. Glick graduated from Cornell University with a degree in Government and International Relations, where she was a member of Alpha Epsilon Phi Sorority. She graduated from Columbia University with a master's degree in International Affairs. She earned a Master's in Business Administration from the Robert H. Smith School of Business at the University of Maryland.

Career 

Glick worked for 12 years as a Foreign Service Officer at the United States Department of State. She later worked for IBM as a global account executive, where she co-authored three patents as part of IBM Research. Glick served as the Deputy Secretary of the Maryland Department of Aging from 2017 until 2019 under Governor Larry Hogan.

In her role as deputy administrator of USAID, Glick served as the chief operating officer of the agency. Among the issues she championed were digital transformation, the significance of 5G as a development priority in emerging markets, private sector engagement, democracy and governance, global vaccine distribution, and food security. She was the Executive Sponsor of USAID's COVID-19 Task Force that addressed both the safety and security of the global workforce and the international response to the outbreak.  She led the Administrator's Action Alliance for Preventing Sexual Misconduct, the Executive Diversity Council, the Agency's Enterprise Risk Management Council, the Partner Vetting Council, and the Management Operations Council. As USAID's Chief Operating Officer, she represented the Agency on the President's Management Council.  

Glick was due to become USAID's acting administrator on November 7, 2020, when Acting Administrator John Barsa would have reached the maximum time period allowed to serve in that position without Senate confirmation under the Federal Vacancies Reform Act of 1998. Hours before that limit was reached, Glick received a note from the White House, telling her that she needed to resign by 5 p.m. or Trump would fire her without cause. Glick refused to resign and was notified that her appointment had been terminated. This enabled Trump to name Barsa as acting deputy administrator, effectively keeping him at the helm of the agency.

After leaving the Trump Administration, Glick joined the Center for Strategic and International Studies as a Senior Advisor and became a Fellow in the Harvard University Institute of Politics. In September 2021 she became the Director of the Krach Institute for Tech Diplomacy at Purdue.

Personal life 
Glick speaks seven languages including English, Spanish, Portuguese, Hebrew, Amharic, French, and Russian. She is married and has two sons.  

Glick has written opinion pieces for the Washington Jewish Week, Newsweek, Deseret News and technology publications. Glick served on the Maryland-Israel Sister State Committee.  She was appointed by Maryland governor Larry Hogan to serve on the board of trustees of Saint Mary's College of Maryland. She has served in leadership positions on a number of non-profit and corporate boards and serves as vice chair of Folkson Farms.

See also 

 Friendshoring

References 

Living people
Year of birth missing (living people)
Trump administration personnel
Maryland Republicans
Cornell University alumni
Jewish American government officials
People from Chicago